The Triumph Tiger 80 is a British motorcycle first made by Triumph from 1937. There was also a 250cc Tiger 70 and a 500cc Tiger 90. Production of the Tiger ended with the outbreak of World War II and never resumed after the Triumph works at Priory Street in Coventry were completely destroyed during The Blitz in 1940 by heavy German bombing.

Development
Triumph had been losing money during the great depression of the 1930s and decided to concentrate on car production. However; Ariel Motorcycles Managing Director Jack Sangster had brought his company back into the black with the Ariel Square Four and was persuaded by its designer Edward Turner to take over Triumph.  In 1935, Sangster appointed Turner to run the Triumph motorcycle division.

Turner designed a new range of lightweight singles which were marketed as the Tiger 70, 80, and 90, with the model number representing the top speed and they sold well, enabling the company to break even in the first year and making a good profit the next, re-establishing Triumph. The company went on to become one of Britain's most successful motorcycle firms. The pre-war Tigers had distinctive chrome tanks and silver side panels.

When World War II broke out in 1939, the Tiger was developed into the military Triumph 3HW model. The Triumph works was destroyed by German bombers on the night of 14 November 1940 – along with much of the city of Coventry bringing production of the Tiger 80 to an end.  When Triumph recovered and began production again at Meriden, only the Tiger 100 survived in the new production line.

The historic Tiger name was revived by the new Hinckley Triumph company in 1994.

Maudes Trophy Trial
Harold "Harry" Perrey was a motorcycle trials rider and the Competitions Manager at Ariel during the 1930s and responsible for sporting events to promote Ariel's motorcycle sales. In 1937, Jack Sangster asked Perrey to create a promotional event for Triumph and he devised a three-hour, high speed race for the three Tiger singles around Donington Park race track, followed the next day by a maximum speed lap of the Brooklands circuit. The motorcycles used were a Tiger 70, 80, and 90 from local Triumph dealerships and not specially race prepared. The Brooklands results for the Tiger 80, which was ridden by Allan Jefferies was an average speed of 74.68 mph.

Museum exhibits
The London Motorcycle Museum has a 1938 Triumph Tiger 80 on display and the Solvang Vintage Motorcycle Museum in California has a fully restored 1939 model.

References

External links

 1939 Triumph Tiger 80 Factory Brochure
 Picture of 1939 Triumph Tiger 80

Tiger 80